Ōgushi, Ogushi, Oogushi or Ohgushi (written: 大串) is a Japanese surname. Notable people with the surname include:

, Japanese politician
, Japanese hurdler

Japanese-language surnames